Güneş Gürle (born July 7, 1975 in İzmir, Turkey) is a Turkish opera singer, bass-baritone.

Career
Made his operatic debut at the State Opera Istanbul in the 2002-03 season as Don Giovanni in Mozart's masterpiece.
Which led his career to Mozart roles such as Giovanni, Leporello, Figaro, Bartolo, Don Alfonso and Osmin.

He has performed under conductors such as Umberto Benedetti Michelangeli, Omar Meir Welber, Daniele Gatti, Paolo Carignani, Alexander Joel and Hans Wallat. He has sung at Theater an der Wien, Bavarian State Opera, Vlaamse Opera, Stadttheater Bern and Deutsche Oper am Rhein.

Awards
Donizetti Classical Music Awards, Male Opera Singer of the Year 2013

Leyla Gencer Voice Competition, Jury Mention Award, 1997

DVD
La bohème, as Colline, Robert Dornhelm as director, Opernfestspiele St. Margarethen

References

External links
Chacun dans sa langue ! La libre, Nicolas Blanmont
 Le Soir, Michele Friche
Startseite - Deutsche Oper am Rhein deutsche oper am rhein
Seite nicht gefunden [Fehler 404]: BR.de - der Bayerische Rundfunk im Internet Bayerischer Rundfunk Klassik

1975 births
Living people
21st-century Turkish male opera singers
Operatic bass-baritones